is the 8th major single by the Japanese girl idol group S/mileage. It was released in Japan on December 28, 2011, on the label Hachama.

The physical CD single debuted at number 4 in the Oricon daily singles chart.

In the Oricon weekly chart, it debuted at number five.

B-sides 
The B-side of the regular edition is a cover of the song "Te o Nigitte Arukitai" by Maki Gotō. She released it as a single in 2002.

Release 
The single was released in five versions: four limited editions (Limited Editions A, B, C, and  D) and a regular edition.

All the limited editions came with a sealed-in serial-numbered entry card for the lottery to win a ticket to one of the single's launch events.

The corresponding DVD single (so called Single V) was released 2 weeks later, on January 11, 2012.

Personnel 
S/mileage members: 
 Ayaka Wada
 Yūka Maeda
 Kanon Fukuda
 Kana Nakanishi
 Akari Takeuchi
 Rina Katsuta
 Meimi Tamura

Track listing

Regular Edition

Limited Editions A, B, C

Limited Edition D

Charts

References

External links 
 Profile of the CD single on the official website of Hello! Project
 Profile of the CD single on the official website of Up-Front Works
 Profile of the DVD single on the official website of Hello! Project

2011 singles
Japanese-language songs
Angerme songs
Songs written by Tsunku
Song recordings produced by Tsunku
2011 songs